The list of shipwrecks in 1897 includes ships sunk, foundered, grounded, or otherwise lost during 1897.

January

1 January

2 January

3 January

6 January

7 January

9 January

14 January

21 January

28 January

29 January

30 January

Unknown date

February

1 February

2 February

4 February

7 February

8 February

9 February

11 February

12 February

13 February

14 February

21 February

22 February

23 February

26 February

March

2 March

4 March

5 March

8 March

9 March

12 March

14 March

15 March

17 March

18 March

19 March

22 March

25 March

28 March

30 March

31 March

April

1 April

2 April

3 April

5 April

7 April

9 April

11 April

12 April

16 April

17 April

19 April

27 April

29 April

Unknown date

May

1 May

3 May

5 May

6 May

8 May

9 May

10 May

16 May

18 May

20 May

31 May

June

2 June

9 June

12 June

14 June

15 June

16 June

18 June

20 June

21 June

25 June

30 June

July

1 July

5 July

9 July

15 July

17 July

19 July

20 July

25 July

26 July

28 July

31 July

August

3 August

4 August

5 August

9 August

12 August

13 August

16 August

18 August

21 August

24 August

25 August

31 August

September

1 September

6 September

7 September

11 September

12 September

13 September

14 September

15 September

16 September

18 September

20 September

21 September

22 September

28 September

29 September

Unknown date

October

1 October

2 October

3 October

6 October

7 October

8 October

10 October

12 October

16 October

17 October

19 October

21 October

23 October

24 October

28 October

29 October

Unknown date

November

1 November

5 November

6 November

7 November

8 November

11 November

12 November

13 November

17 November

18 November

22 November

23 November

24 November

25 November

26 November

27 November

29 November

Unknown date

December

2 December

5 December

6 December

7 December

9 December

13 December

14 December

18 December

22 December

23 December

24 December

25 December

29 December

30 December

Unknown date

Unknown date

References

1897